Stawley is a village and civil parish in Somerset, England, situated  west of Taunton in the Somerset West and Taunton district.  The parish has a population of 279 and includes the village of Kittisford and the hamlets of Appley, Greenham and Tracebridge.

History
The manor was recorded in Domesday Book of 1086 as  held by Robert and Herbert from the overlord Alfred d'Epaignes. Later the manor was the property of the Powlett family of Hinton St George.
The parishes of Kittisford and Stawley were part of the historic Milverton hundred,

Hill Farm was built in the late 16th century. It is a Grade II* listed building. The farm now has around 100 goats and makes three kinds of cheese.

Greenham
The hamlet of Greenham is located on the banks of the River Tone, and has two historic houses within its area. The 19th century St Peter's Church, Greenham, was built in the Gothic Revival style and was consecrated on 7 July 1860 on land given to the parish by Thomas Edward Clarke, of Tremlett House. In its graveyard is buried Sir Edward du Cann (1924-2017), the longtime Member of Parliament for Taunton Deane and former owner of Cothay Manor.

Historic estates
Cothay Manor House was built around 1480.
Greenham Barton was built in 1280.
Kittisford Barton. Gerald Gardiner took the title "Baron Gardiner of Kittisford" when he was made a life peer.

Amenities
Since 1999 work has been underway to move and re-establish the village shop and post office, which opened on a new site in 2006 near the primary school.

Governance
The parish council has responsibility for local issues, including setting an annual precept (local rate) to cover the council’s operating costs and producing annual accounts for public scrutiny. The parish council evaluates local planning applications and works with the local police, district council officers, and neighbourhood watch groups on matters of crime, security, and traffic. The parish council's role also includes initiating projects for the maintenance and repair of parish facilities, as well as consulting with the district council on the maintenance, repair, and improvement of highways, drainage, footpaths, public transport, and street cleaning. Conservation matters (including trees and listed buildings) and environmental issues are also the responsibility of the council.

The village falls within the non-metropolitan district of Somerset West and Taunton, which was established on 1 April 2019. It was previously in the district of Taunton Deane, which was formed on 1 April 1974 under the Local Government Act 1972, and part of Wellington Rural District before that. The district council is responsible for local planning and building control, local roads, council housing, environmental health, markets and fairs, refuse collection and recycling, cemeteries and crematoria, leisure services, parks, and tourism.

Somerset County Council is responsible for running the largest and most expensive local services such as education, social services, libraries, main roads, public transport, policing and  fire services, trading standards, waste disposal and strategic planning.

It is also part of the Taunton Deane county constituency represented in the House of Commons of the Parliament of the United Kingdom. It elects one Member of Parliament (MP) by the first past the post system of election.

Geography
The soil consists of clay, with a subsoil of sandstone and limestone. The village has a high density of rare flora and fauna, including eight species of endangered birds.

Religious sites
The parish Church of St Michael dates from the 13th century and has been designated as a Grade I listed building. The church register dates from 1528.

The Church of St Nicholas in Kittisford dates from the 15th century.

References

External links

 
 
 
 

Villages in Taunton Deane
Civil parishes in Somerset